The 1987 Mecca incident was a clash between Shia pilgrim demonstrators and the Saudi Arabian security forces, during the Hajj pilgrimage; it occurred in Mecca on 31 July 1987 and resulted in the deaths of more than 400 people. The event has been variously described as a "riot" or a "massacre". It developed from increasing tensions between Shia Iran and Sunni Saudi Arabia. Since 1981, Iranian pilgrims had performed an annual political demonstration against Israel and the United States, but in 1987, a cordon of Saudi police and the Saudi Arabian National Guard had sealed part of the planned anti-Western demonstration route, resulting in a confrontation between them and the pilgrims. This escalated into a violent clash, followed by a deadly stampede. 

There is controversy regarding the details of the incident, with both Iran and Saudi Arabia blaming each other. Official Saudi reports state that 402 people died in the incident including 275 Iranian pilgrims, 85 Saudi police, and 42 pilgrims from other countries. However, Iran reported the death of 400 Iranian pilgrims and the injury of several thousand. According to The New York Times, more than 400 pilgrims had died, and thousands more were injured. After the incident, Iranians attacked the Saudi, Kuwaiti and French Embassies, abducting four Saudis from the embassy.

Background
For years, Iranian pilgrims had tried to stage demonstrations known as "Distancing Ourselves from Mushrikīn" (برائت از مشرکين) in the Muslim holy city of Mecca during the hajj. "Anti shah, anti-Israel and anti-American propaganda during the Hajj" by devotees of Khomeini had been happening since about 1971. These demonstrations had their origins in 1971, when Ruhollah Khomeini instructed his Shiite followers to distribute political messages when performing their pilgrimage. Even though a few Iranians were arrested for this act, the Saudi officials were generally apathetic, as they did not view these political messages to be a threat to the Saudi royalty. After the revolution, Iran claimed that "the Hajj and the Holy places should be placed under international oversight as opposed to being managed by the Saudis alone". These disturbances were reacted to by the Saudi government with increasing concern because "the Hajj is an important legitimizing factor for the Saudi ruling family".

The first large clash between Shia pilgrims and Saudi security forces occurred in 1981. In 1981, this was escalated to chanting political slogans in the Masjid al-Haram and the Prophet's Mosque, two of the holiest sites in Islam, resulting in violent clashes with Saudi security and one death. In the same year, King Khalid of Saudi Arabia wrote a letter to Saddam Hussein saying "crush these stupid Iranians" as Saddam continued with the invasion of Iranian territory.

Before the demonstrations started, Khomeini instructed the Iranian pilgrims to maintain peace and remain civil during the pilgrimage. During the next few years, both sides tried to calm the situation: Khomeini urged his devotees to maintain peace and order, not to distribute printed political material, and not to criticize Muslim governments. In return, Saudi officials changed their earlier policy and allowed two separate demonstrations to occur: One in Mecca, and the other in Medina. By 1986, the situation was calm enough for Saudi officials to re-open the al-Baqi' cemetery for Shiite pilgrims, and in response, Khomeini's representative formally thanked the Saudi King for the gesture. However, in the same year, Iranian radical Mehdi Hashemi was accused of smuggling explosives on an airplane headed for Saudi Arabia, renewing Saudi fears.

Demonstrations

According to the speech early in July 1987, Khoiniha said that "a mere march or demonstration by Iranians would not suffice. He demanded that the Saudi regime allow Iranian pilgrims to enter the Great Mosque in Mecca at the end of their demonstration where their representative would explain Iran’s case regarding the Iran Iraq war". As a result of strict dialogues, it was allowed that "the demonstration would end half a kilometer before the great Mosque", but the decision "put the Saudi security forces on a high state of alert".

On Friday 31 July 1987, the demonstration started amid heightened security after Friday's midday prayers, while Iranian pilgrims chanted "Death to America! Death to the Soviet Union! Death to Israel!". The march was uneventful until the end of the planned route when the demonstrators found their way blocked by Saudi riot police and National Guardsmen. At this point, some of the Iranians began to call for the demonstrations to press ahead and continue to the Great Mosque. While this was happening, unidentified persons began harassing the Iranian pilgrims by throwing bricks and other objects at them from a nearby location. These factors exacerbated the situation, escalating it into a violent clash between the Iranian pilgrims and Saudi security, with the Saudis reportedly using truncheons and electric prods and the Iranians using knives and clubs.

The details are controversial.Saudi security personnel reportedly began firing at the demonstrators, a charge which Saudi officials deny. Iranian officials maintain that the Saudis had fired on the protesters without provocation and that the demonstrations had been peaceful. Saudi officials insist that no shots were fired, and that all deaths were caused by the melee and stampede. In a Washington news conference, the Saudi ambassador Prince Bandar bin Sultan claimed that "not one bullet was fired", blaming the violence on the Iranian pilgrims who he accused of "brandishing knives, clubs and broken glass drawn from beneath their cloaks". Robin Wright also reports that "Many of the Iranian bodies, shown to American and European reporters immediately upon their return to Tehran, had bullet punctures." Ami Ayalon, an Israeli politician, wrote that "most of the Iranian pilgrims apparently shot by Saudi security authorities during the demonstration".

Casualties
The rioting and the resulting stampede caused a reported 402 dead (275 Iranians, 85 Saudis including policemen, and 42 pilgrims from other countries) and 649 wounded (303 Iranians, 145 Saudis and 201 other nationals). The Iranian news agency announced that "200 Iranians had been killed and more than 2,000 wounded".

Aftermath

Further adding to the tensions were the demands made by Mohammad Mousavi Khoeiniha in 1987 to allow the Iranian pilgrims to perform their demonstrations within the Great Mosque itself, and without the presence of security guards. Khoeiniha had been earlier appointed as the supervisor and personal representative of Ayatollah Khomeini for Hajj affairs, but had been expelled from Saudi Arabia in 1982. Even though Mehdi Karrubi, who was Khomeini's official pilgrimage representative that year, tried to assure Saudi officials that the demonstrations would occur in the usual manner and in the agreed routes, it did little to quell the Saudi fears.

After the incident of 1987, the Hajj for three years between 1988 and 1990 was banned by Iran for Iranians, Although "diplomatic ties were restored in 1991".

On 1 August 1987, a spontaneous demonstration by enraged Iranians ended with attacks on the Kuwaiti and Saudi embassies in Tehran. On the same day, the Iranian leader Khomeini called on Saudis to overthrow the House of Saud to avenge the pilgrims' deaths.

Saudi Arabia ended relations with Iran and reduced the number of permitted Iranian pilgrims to 45,000, down from 150,000 in earlier years. Iran boycotted the Hajj for three years, from 1988 to 1990. In 1991, Iran and Saudi Arabia renewed diplomatic relations after agreeing to allow Iranian pilgrims to perform the Hajj once more. The total number of pilgrims was set at 115,000, and the demonstrations were allowed to be performed, but only in one specific location granted by the Saudis. By this agreement, Iranian pilgrims continued their annual demonstration during the 1990s and 2000s with few or no incidents. They limited their rally to within the confines of their compound in Mecca.

Approximately 20,000 Pakistani troops stationed in Saudi Arabia were sent back to Pakistan, as Saudi Arabia was uncomfortable with the presence of Shi'ite soldiers.

Reaction
Ali Khamenei said after the incident that "They are now propagandizing and claiming that this incident was a war between Shia and Sunni. This is a lie! Of course, there is a war, but a war between the American perception of Islam and true revolutionary Islam."

Ayatollah Hussein Ali Montazeri asked Muslim religious leaders to "wrest control of Islam's holy sites in Saudi Arabia from the royal family". In Iraq, the Revolutionary Command Council, ostensibly an organ of the secular Baath Arab socialist party, demanded that visiting of Islam's holy sites by Iranians should be banned. The Party of God in Lebanon asked Saudi Arabia to "pay for the deaths of the Shiite pilgrims".

See also
List of modern conflicts in the Middle East
Shi'a–Sunni relations
Incidents during the Hajj

Notes

 "Iranian Official Urge 'Uprooting' of Saudi Royalty", The New York Times, 3 August 1987
 "Gulf Tensions Rise", The New York Times, 2 August 1987

References

External links
 Carnage in Mecca
 Khomeini’s Messengers in Mecca

Mecca
1987 in Iran
Massacre of Iranian pilgrims
20th century in Mecca
Riots and civil disorder in Saudi Arabia
Incidents during the Hajj
Protests in Saudi Arabia
Massacres in Saudi Arabia
Shia–Sunni sectarian violence
Iran–Saudi Arabia relations
Iran–Saudi Arabia proxy conflict
1987 disasters in Saudi Arabia